Roger Michael Kelly (19 December 1943 – 14 June 2014), known by the stage name Sam Kelly, was an English actor who appeared in film, television, radio and theatre. He is best known for his roles as Captain Hans Geering in 'Allo 'Allo!, Warren in Porridge, Sam in On the Up, and Ted Liversidge in Barbara.

Early life
Kelly was born in Salford, Lancashire on 19 December 1943 and abandoned; he was adopted by a couple who moved to Liverpool. There he attended the Liverpool Collegiate School and was a chorister at Liverpool Cathedral, where he showed early acting talent by reciting monologues. He worked for three years in the Civil Service in Liverpool before training as an actor at the London Academy of Music and Dramatic Art. After graduating in 1967, he appeared in repertory theatres around the UK.

Career
His early roles included playing a film director in Tiffany Jones (1973) and appearances in two of the later Carry On films, Carry On Dick (1974) and Carry On Behind (1975). He then had a significant role in the British sitcom Porridge as the affable and high spirited Slade Prison inmate Bunny Warren who relies on fellow prisoners to read his letters from home and blames his incarceration on his inability to read. In the sitcom 'Allo 'Allo! he played German officer Captain Hans Geering, leaving after the third series (something he later said that he regretted doing).  He played the law-stationer Mr. Snagsby in the 1985 BBC adaptation of Bleak House. In On the Up he played Dennis Waterman's chauffeur and he appeared in We'll Think of Something as Les Brooks. From 1990 to 1992, he co-starred in the comedy television series Haggard. In 1994, he appeared as Mr. Mould, the undertaker, in the BBC mini-series Martin Chuzzlewit. From 1999 to 2003, he played Barbara's husband Ted in the British sitcom Barbara.

In 1996, Kelly appeared at the National Theatre in Helen Edmundson's adaptation of Leo Tolstoy's War and Peace. He played Bernard in Holding On (1997) and Carl Langbehn in the five-part television drama Christabel (1988). He appeared in Midsomer Murders episode "Down Among the Dead Men" as Jack Fothergill in 2006 and as the eccentric impoverished ghostwriter, Majors, in the Inspector Morse episode "Second Time Around".

Kelly went on to play Sir Joseph Porter in H.M.S. Pinafore with the new D'Oyly Carte Opera Company in 2002, having taken the role of Monsieur Jourdain "as a kind of Baroque Blackadder" in the 1912 version of Strauss's Ariadne auf Naxos with Scottish Opera at the 1997 Edinburgh Festival.
In 1998, Kelly appeared as George Spelvin in a concert version of Strike Up the Band at the Barbican in London and also was seen in an episode of the first series of Cold Feet, playing Algernon Gifford.

On radio, he played the part of Carter Brandon in the BBC Radio 4 series of the continuing adventures of Uncle Mort and Carter Brandon in Uncle Mort's South Country and Uncle Mort's Celtic Fringe. These were written by Peter Tinniswood.

In 2004, he appeared in the EastEnders one-off episode Pat and Mo  playing Stan Porter, and he also appeared in the comedy series Black Books as the father of Manny. In 2006 he appeared as the villain Guy Carse in New Tricks.

Kelly starred in Jean-Paul Sartre's play Kean alongside Antony Sher at the Theatre Royal, Bath and in the West End in May 2007. In December 2007, a car struck and injured Kelly in the West End. He was due to have performed in the Doctor Who episode ("Midnight") filmed that month, but the role was taken by David Troughton instead. Kelly though did act in the Doctor Who audio dramas "The Holy Terror" and "Return to the Web Planet" by Big Finish Productions.

In 2008, he guest starred in the Sapphire and Steel audio drama Remember Me. In November 2008, he starred in the title role of Christopher Reason's radio dramatisation of Jaroslav Hašek's The Good Soldier Švejk, broadcast on BBC Radio 4.

From May 2009, Kelly starred as the Wizard in the West End production of the musical Wicked, replacing Desmond Barrit. From 27 March 2010 he was succeeded by Clive Carter.

He worked with director Mike Leigh on several occasions, including Knock for Knock (1976), Grown-Ups (1980), Topsy-Turvy (1999), All or Nothing (2002), A Running Jump (2012) and on stage at the National Theatre in Grief (September 2011). His final film role was a cameo appearance in Leigh's Mr. Turner (2014).

Kelly's later roles were as the ARP warden in Nanny McPhee and the Big Bang (2010), and as the old boatman, John Merdell, in the ITV production of Dead Man's Folly in the final (2013) series of Agatha Christie’s Poirot, the last episode of the series to be filmed.

On 23 July 2010, Kelly guest starred as Martin in the sitcom My Family in the episode Desperately Stalking Susan. From October 2010 to February 2011 he starred in When We Are Married at London's Garrick Theatre.

Last years and death
Kelly was in a long-term relationship with journalist and psychotherapist Grace Pieniazek until her death in 2009.

Kelly returned  to Wicked as the Wizard on 18 November 2013. It was reported in January 2014 that Kelly had temporarily departed the production due to ill health, and that his replacement from 17 February 2014 would be Martyn Ellis. 

He was admitted to a hospice on 13 June 2014 and died early the next morning aged 70 after a long battle with cancer.

References

External links
 

1943 births
2014 deaths
Deaths from cancer in England
Male actors from Salford
People educated at Liverpool Collegiate Institution
Alumni of the London Academy of Music and Dramatic Art
English male stage actors
English male television actors
English male film actors
English male radio actors
English people of Irish descent
20th-century English male actors
21st-century English male actors
British male comedy actors